List of UK by-elections (1979–present) may refer to:
 List of United Kingdom by-elections (1979–2010)
 List of United Kingdom by-elections (2010–present)